Seul en scène – Olympia 1972 (Alone on stage) is a double album by poet and singer-songwriter Léo Ferré, recorded live during his time at the Olympia in Paris, in November 1972. Published by Barclay Records in 1973, the record does not initially render the recital in its entirety.

To celebrate the centenary of the birth of the artist, Universal released for the first time in September 2016 a complete version, which includes ten songs missing.

Track listing
All tracks written and composed by Léo Ferré except where noted.

The track list here is based on the 2016 complete edition. Songs marked (*) were absent in the original vinyl edition and 2001 and 2003 CD editions.

Disc one

Disc two

Personnel 
 Léo Ferré – vocals
 Paul Castanier – piano

Production 
 Engineering: Claude Achallé
 Executive producer: Richard Marsan
 Artwork: Patrick Ullmann

References

Léo Ferré albums
1973 live albums
Barclay (record label) live albums
French-language live albums